The leader of the government in the House of Commons, more commonly known as the government house leader, is the Cabinet minister responsible for planning and managing the government's legislative program in the House of Commons of Canada. Despite the name of the position it does not refer to the prime minister of Canada, who is the head of government.

History 
From 1867 until World War II, prime ministers took upon themselves the responsibilities of being leader of the government in the House of Commons, organizing and coordinating House of Commons business with the other parties. The expansion of government responsibilities during the war led to Prime Minister William Lyon Mackenzie King deciding to delegate the House leadership to one of his ministers. In 1946, the position of government house leader was formally recognized. 

In 1968, Prime Minister Pierre Trudeau designated the government house leader as president of the Queen's Privy Council for Canada. Under Prime Minister Brian Mulroney, the roles of government house leader and president of the Privy Council were separated in 1989. Under Mulroney and his successors, the position of house leader would often be held by someone who was named a minister of state without any portfolio responsibilities specified. Since 2003, this minister of state status has been obscured in all but the most official circumstances by the use of a "Leader of the Government in the House of Commons" style in its place.

Prime Minister Paul Martin's first House Leader, Jacques Saada was also the minister responsible for democratic reform; however, with the election of a minority government in the 2004 election, Martin appointed Tony Valeri to the position of leader of the government in the House of Commons with no additional responsibilities.

List of officeholders
Until 2005, the position of government house leader was not technically a cabinet-level post, but rather a parliamentary office, so to qualify for cabinet membership, an individual had to be named to cabinet in some other capacity. For a time, with the position having evolved into a full-time job, government house leaders have been named to cabinet as ministers of state with no portfolio specified. The Martin government created these positions so that the minister of state title is effectively invisible. An amendment to the Salaries Act made this unnecessary by listing the government house leader as a minister.

Key:

1. The Turner Ministry never convened the House, so Ouellet never technically served as government house leader.  He was also named "Minister of State for Economic and Regional Development".

2. During this period Erik Nielsen, the Conservative house leader when the party had been in Opposition, had the position of president of the Queen's Privy Council for Canada. In practice this meant that Nielsen was senior government house leader in all but name and that Hnatyshyn was, in practice, Nielsen's deputy despite having the title of government house leader. This situation ended when Hnatyshyn became president of the Privy Council on February 27, 1985.

3. From August 27, 1987 Mazankowski was also president of the Treasury Board (until March 30, 1988) and minister responsible for privatization and regulatory affairs (until January 29, 1989). From September 15, 1988 he was also minister of agriculture.

4. The Campbell Ministry never convened the House, so Lewis never technically served as government house leader.

5. LeBlanc took over the portfolio after the resignation of Hunter Tootoo.

6. During the cabinet shuffle on July 18, 2018, the portfolio was reassigned to Mary Ng. Chagger was not assigned a new additional cabinet portfolio after the shuffle.

References 

Canadian ministers
Westminster system
Legislative leaders